Kallai is the twin city of Poonch in the Indian union territory of Jammu and Kashmir. Most inhabitants are literate and are associated with agriculture.

References

Cities and towns in Poonch district, India